John Carthy may refer to:

 John Dennis Carthy (1923–1972), British zoologist and ethologist 
 John Carthy (1972–2000), Irish man killed by the police in controversial circumstances